Ludhiana City Centre is a multi-crore proposed project (now abandoned) which was launched in year 2003 in Shaheed Bhagat Singh Nagar, near Pakhowal road, Ludhiana, India. The proposed project would have five major constituents — The Mall, The Heights, The Forum, The Podium and Five-star hotel. The City centre has been spread over  having shopping malls, 12 multiplexes, residential apartments, helipad and parking slot.

City centre scam
Later, it was embroiled in major controversy with allegation of multi-crore scam and now its construction has been stalled by Punjab High court.

See also
Hyatt Regency Ludhiana

References

Economy of Ludhiana
Buildings and structures in Ludhiana
Ludhiana